There are 75 counties in the U.S. state of Arkansas. Arkansas is tied with Mississippi for the most counties with two county seats, at 10.


Counties

|}

Former counties in Arkansas

Lovely County
Created on October 13, 1827, partitioned from Crawford County.  The Treaty of Washington, 1828 ceded most of its territory to Indian Territory.  Abolished October 17, 1828 with the remaining portion becoming Washington County.

Miller County
Created from Hempstead County.  Most of its northern portion was in Choctaw Nation (now part of Oklahoma); rest of northern portion was dissolved into Sevier County in 1828. All of its southern portion was in Texas, and was nominally dissolved into Lafayette County in 1838. The present Miller County was created in 1874 from an area that was part of Lafayette County before the former Miller County was dissolved.

Notes

References

External links 
 State of Arkansas local government resources search

Arkansas, counties in
 
Counties